WYZD (1560 AM) is a Christian radio station licensed to Dobson, North Carolina, United States. The station serves the Piedmont Triad area. The station is owned by Gospel Broadcasting, Inc.

References

External links

Surry County, North Carolina
YZD
YZD